The 1960 SupaTura British Saloon Car Championship was the third season of the championship. This year the championship ran to a 'silhouette' formula with an engine capacity limit of 1000cc. Doc Shepherd won the drivers title with an Austin A40 ran by Don Moore Racing, after finishing as runner-up the previous year.

Calendar & winners
All races were held in the United Kingdom. Overall winners of multi-class races in bold.

Championship results

References

External links
Official website of the British Touring Car Championship

British Touring Car Championship seasons
British Saloon Car Championship